The Changsha coup was a mutiny in Changsha on the evening of May 21, 1927. It was led by Xu Keqiang, a regiment commander under General Tang Shengzhi. Up to "several thousands" of peaants were killed in the coup.

References

Citations

Bibliography

 

1927 in China